William Burgh may refer to:

William de Burgh (MP) (1741–1808), also called William Burgh, Irish landowner who opposed slavery
William Burgh (MP for Lanesborough) for Lanesborough (Parliament of Ireland constituency) during the Merciless Parliament
William Burgh (fl. 1421), MP for Maldon (UK Parliament constituency) in 1421
William Burgh (died 1552), MP for Great Yarmouth (UK Parliament constituency)

See also
William de Burgh (disambiguation)
William Burke (disambiguation), once used interchangeably with Burgh
William Berg (disambiguation)